The Alexander the Great Marathon is an annual marathon race held in mid-April between Pella (birthplace of Alexander the Great) and Thessaloniki, Greece, since 2006.

It is an AIMS-certified race, and its editions of 2010 and 2011 received IAAF Bronze Label Road Race status.

In addition to the marathon race, the day's events include popular fun runs over five and ten kilometres.

History 

The 2020 edition of the race was postponed to 2021 due to the coronavirus pandemic, with all entries automatically remaining valid for 2021.

Course 

The race starts from Pella, the birthplace of Alexander the Great and capital of Ancient Macedonia, and finishes in Thessaloniki.

Winners 

Key: Course record (in bold)

Statistics

Winners by country

Multiple winners

See also
Athens Classic Marathon

Notes

References

External links
Official website
Race profile from MarathonInfo

Marathons in Greece
Sport in Thessaloniki
Macedonia (Greece)
Recurring sporting events established in 2006
2006 establishments in Greece
Spring (season) events in Greece